Ivan Monighetti (born 1948) is a Russian cellist and conductor of Swiss descent.

Biography

Soloist career
Monighetti worked as a soloist under a direction of the Krzysztof Penderecki at the Berlin Philharmonic and later on worked under Kurt Mazur at the Leipzig Gewandhaus Orchestra. Later on, he worked at the Gulbenkian Orchestra under mentorship of Liz and then worked under Mstislav Rostropovich at the Moscow Philharmonic Orchestra of whom he was the last student.

Conducting career
He first appeared as a conductor was in 1998 at the English Haydn Festival where he conducted the Haydn's Nelson Mass and during both 1999 and 2000 was re-invited numerous times for a principal conductor work. During that year he also founded Camerata Boccherini orchestra with which he traveled through France, the Netherlands, Poland, Estonia and Russia. In 2003 he was awarded Frederic prize and the same year performed Cello concerto at the Martha Argerich Festival which was held in Japan. During the same year he also participated in the Concerto grosso which just like the cello one was composed by Frangiz Ali-Zadeh along with Muhai Tang and Mario Venzago.

Professorship
Currently he is a professor at the Musik-Akademie Basel   in Switzerland and is a guest professor at both the Moscow Conservatory and Reina Sofía School of Music in Madrid. His albums were sold under such labels as Erato Records, Harmonia Mundi, Edel AG and WERGO among others. He also appeared with such musicians as Anner Bylsma, Nancy Argenta, Simon Standage, Ronald Brautigam, Wieland Kuijken, Alexei Lubimov and many others and on such American festivals as Ravinia and Santa Fe Chamber Music Festivals and German ones such as Schleswig-Holstein Musik and Berliner Festspiele.

References

External links
Ivan Monighetti

REDIRECT

Living people
1948 births
Academic staff of the Reina Sofía School of Music
20th-century Russian conductors (music)
Russian male conductors (music)
20th-century Russian male musicians
Russian cellists
21st-century Russian conductors (music)
21st-century Russian male musicians
20th-century cellists
21st-century cellists